The Catholic High School League (CHSL) is a school athletic conference based in Detroit, Michigan, led by director Victor Michaels. Most member schools are also members of the Michigan High School Athletic Association (MHSAA), the governing body for Michigan scholastic sports, except for the five schools from Toledo, which are members of the Ohio High School Athletic Association. Unlike many similar leagues, the CHSL governs secondary, middle, and elementary sports for most of the parochial schools in the Detroit area. Most league schools are Catholic, but there are other religious denominations as well. Every school in the CHSL is a private school. In 2019, the CHSL council voted to rename the AB/ Division I/II championship to the Bishop division championship, and the CD/ Division III/IV championship to the Cardinal Division championship.

Member schools

Sports
At the high school level, the league supports sixteen girls sports and fourteen boys sports.

Girls Sports: basketball, bowling, cheerleading, cross -country, field hockey, golf, ice hockey, lacrosse, pom-pon, ski, soccer, softball, swimming, tennis, track and volleyball.

Boys Sports: baseball, basketball, bowling, cross-country, football, golf, ice hockey, lacrosse, ski, soccer, swimming, tennis, track and wrestling.

Girls CHSL Divisions
Divisional alignments may vary from sport to sport, depending upon the number of schools participating in the sport and the enrollment of those participating schools. Listed below are typical divisional alignments for a common sport, in this case girls basketball (as of April, 2015).

Central Division
 Bloomfield Hills Marian
 Dearborn Divine Child
 Farmington Hills Mercy
 Warren Regina

AA Division
 Allen Park Cabrini 
 Ann Arbor Father Gabriel Richard
 Macomb Lutheran North 
 Pontiac Notre Dame Preparatory 
 Riverview Gabriel Richard

East Division
 Clarkston Everest Collegiate
 Bloomfield Hills Cranbrook-Kingswood
 Madison Heights Bishop Foley Catholic
 Marine City Cardinal Mooney Catholic
 Royal Oak Shrine Catholic
 Waterford Our Lady of the Lakes
 Wixom St. Catherine of Siena Academy

West Division
 Bloomfield Hills Academy of the Sacred Heart
 Detroit Cristo Rey 
 Macomb Austin Catholic 
 West Bloomfield Frankel Jewish Academy

Boys CHSL Divisions

Divisional alignments may vary from sport to sport, depending upon the number of schools participating in the sport and the enrollment of those participating schools. Listed below are typical divisional alignments for a common sport, in this case boys basketball (as of April, 2015).

Central Division

 Bloomfield Hills Brother Rice 
 Detroit Catholic Central
 University of Detroit Jesuit 
 Orchard Lake St. Mary's Preparatory 
 Warren De La Salle Collegiate

AA Division
 Ann Arbor Father Gabriel Richard
 Dearborn Divine Child
 Detroit Loyola
 Macomb Lutheran North

Intersectional 1 Division
 Allen Park Cabrini
 Bloomfield Hills Cranbrook-Kingswood 
 Madison Heights Bishop Foley Catholic
 Royal Oak Shrine Catholic
 Waterford Our Lady of the Lakes

Intersectional 2 Division
 Clarkston Everest Catholic
 Detroit Cristo Rey 
 Macomb Austin Catholic 
 Marine City Cardinal Mooney Catholic
 Riverview Gabriel Richard
 West Bloomfield Frankel Jewish Academy

Former League Members (closed schools)

Footnotes:

Monroe County

Catholic Central High School, Monroe (opened in 1944), and St. Mary Academy, Monroe (opened in 1846), became St. Mary Catholic Central High School in 1986 when the two schools merged.

Washtenaw County

Ann Arbor St. Thomas High School became Father Gabriel Richard High School in 1978.

Wayne County

Detroit Cristo Rey High School occupies the former Detroit Holy Redeemer High School building.

Our Lady of Mercy High School in Detroit moved to Farmington in 1965 and changed its name to Mercy High School that same year.

Redford St. Agatha High School became St. Katharine Drexel High School in 2003.

Redford Bishop Borgess High School closed in 2005 and became Redford Covenant High School which closed in 2009.

Accomplishments
Since its founding in 1926, CHSL member schools have won nearly 300 state titles (through 2015).

Former Bloomfield Hills Brother Rice and Royal Oak Shrine head coach Al Fracassa holds the state record for all-time football coaching wins with 430 while Waterford Our Lady of the Lakes' former head coach Mike Boyd is third at 361 wins (all at one school), and current Detroit Catholic Central head coach Tom Mach is fourth with 348 wins (as of 2014).

Current Warren Regina head coach Diane Laffey is the winningest coach in MHSAA softball history with 1,118 victories through the 2015 season.  She also is the third winningest head coach in MHSAA girls basketball with 619 wins as of 2015.

In boys basketball, Orchard Lake St. Mary's is the state's second-winningest all-time program with 1,250 wins (as of 2009).

Bloomfield Hills Cranbrook-Kingswood has the most ever boys ice hockey state championships with seventeen (as of 2015), and the most boys tennis state titles with eighteen (as of 2015). Cranbrook-Kingswood also has sixteen girls tennis state championships, the most ever in that sport in Michigan history (as of 2015).

Detroit St. Martin de Porres holds the record for the most state titles in boys track with fifteen (as of 2015).

Madison Heights Bishop Foley holds the most girls soccer state titles in Michigan history with twelve (as of 2015).

Waterford Our Lady of the Lakes has the most softball state championships in Michigan history with eight (as of 2015).

Bloomfield Hills Brother Rice has won all but one boys lacrosse state championships in Division 1 since the sport started having state championships in 2005.

Notable CHSL Alumni
Names of notable alumni are listed in descending order based on their respective year of high school graduation.

 Cassius Winston, Professional Basketball Player, University of Detroit Jesuit, 2016
 Joshua Gatt, Professional Soccer Player,	Detroit Catholic Central,	2010
 Allen Robinson, Former NFL Player,	Orchard Lake St. Mary's,	2010
 Dion Sims, Former NFL Player,	Orchard Lake St. Mary's,	2009
 Ryan Riess, 2013 World Series of Poker Main Event Champion,	Waterford Our Lady of the Lakes,	2008
 Greg Pateryn, NHL Player,	Bloomfield Hills Brother Rice,	2008
 Mike Martin, NFL Player,	Detroit Catholic Central,	2008
 DJ LeMahieu, MLB Player,	Bloomfield Hills Brother Rice,	2007
 Brad Galli, WXYZ-TV Sports Reporter, 	Bloomfield Hills Brother Rice,	2007
 Kalin Lucas, Former NBA Player,	Orchard Lake St. Mary's,	2007
 T. J. Lang , NFL Player,	Bloomfield Hills Brother Rice,	2005
 Connor Barwin, NFL Player,	University of Detroit Jesuit,	2005
 Morgan Trent, Former NFL Player,	Orchard Lake St. Mary's,	2003
 Geoff Pope, Former NFL Player,	University of Detroit Jesuit,	2002
 Braylon Edwards, Former NFL Player, Harper Woods Bishop Gallagher, 2001
 Grant Mason, Former NFL Player,	Orchard Lake St. Mary's,	2001
 Matt Baker, Retired NFL Player,	Bloomfield Hills Brother Rice,	2001
 Alex Shelley, Professional wrestler,	Detroit Catholic Central,	2001
 Ben Blackwell, writer, drummer, co-founder of Third Man Records, Notre Dame High School (Harper Woods, Michigan), 2000
 Klint Kesto, State Representative (Michigan),	Bloomfield Hills Brother Rice,	1999
 Kristen Bell, Actress,	Royal Oak Shrine,	1998
 Mark Campbell, Former NFL Player, Madison Heights Bishop Foley, 1994
 Doug Brzezinski, Former NFL Player,	Detroit Catholic Central,	1994
 Brooke Elliott, Actress, Riverview Gabriel Richard, 1993
 Kerry Zavagnin, Former MLS Player,	Detroit Catholic Central,	1992
 Ron Rice, NFL Player,	University of Detroit Jesuit,	1991
 Keegan-Michael Key, Actor and Comedian,	Royal Oak Shrine,	1989
 Mike Peplowski, Former NBA Player,	Warren De La Salle, 	1988
 Scott Kowalkowski, Former NFL Player,	Orchard Lake St. Mary's,	1987
 Tom Lewand, former Detroit Lions  President,	Royal Oak Shrine,	1987
 Craig Wolanin, Former NHL Player,	Warren De La Salle, 	1985
 Mike Lodish, Retired NFL Player,	Bloomfield Hills Brother Rice,	1985
 Bob Kula, Retired NFL Player,	Bloomfield Hills Brother Rice,	1985
 B. J. Armstrong,  Retired NBA  Player,	Bloomfield Hills Brother Rice,	1985
 Gus Johnson, Sportscaster,	University of Detroit Jesuit,	1985
 Mark Messner, Former NFL Player,	Detroit Catholic Central,	1984
 Pat Shurmur, Former NFL Head Coach, Dearborn Divine Child, 1983
 Thaddeus McCotter, Former U.S. Congressman,	Detroit Catholic Central,	1983
 Meg Mallon, Professional Golfer, Farmington Mercy, 1981
 Tom Jankiewicz, Screenwriter, Madison Heights Bishop Foley, 1981
 Steve Phillips, Former New York Mets General Manager,	Warren De La Salle, 	1981
 Thomas Sugrue, Historian,	Bloomfield Hills Brother Rice,	1980
 Denis O'Hare, Actor,	Bloomfield Hills Brother Rice,	1980
 Brian Brennan , NFL Player,	Bloomfield Hills Brother Rice,	1980
 Mike Cox, Former Michigan Attorney General,	Detroit Catholic Central,	1980
 Andy Dillon, Former Michigan Speaker of the House,	Detroit Catholic Central,	1980
 Michealene Risley, Writer and Director, Madison Heights Bishop Foley, 1978
 Jim Paciorek, Former MLB Player,	Orchard Lake St. Mary's,	1978
 Brian Zahara, Michigan Supreme Court Justice, Dearborn Divine Child, 1977
 Bill Sheridan, Former NFL Player,	Warren De La Salle, 	1977
 Chris Hansen , Former NBC Television News Reporter,	Bloomfield Hills Brother Rice,	1977
 Chris Godfrey, Former NFL Player,	Warren De La Salle, 	1976
 Mike Duggan, Mayor of Detroit,	Detroit Catholic Central,	1976
 Mike Bouchard, Oakland County (Michigan) Sheriff,	Bloomfield Hills Brother Rice,	1974
 Tom LaGarde, Member of 1976 U.S. Olympic basketball team and retired NBA Player,	Detroit Catholic Central,	1973
 Greg Collins ,  Actor and retired NFL Player,	Bloomfield Hills Brother Rice,	1971
 Frank Tanana, Retired MLB Player,	Detroit Catholic Central,	1971
 Joseph LoDuca, Music Composer,	Warren De La Salle, 	1970
 Bill Simpson, Former NFL Player,	Royal Oak Shrine,	1970
 Mike Varty, Former NFL Player, Austin Catholic Preparatory, 1970
 Gary Danielson, Former NFL Player, Dearborn Divine Child, 1969
 Peter Leonard, Author, Bloomfield Hills Brother Rice,	1969
 David M. Lawson, United States Federal Judge,	Bloomfield Hills Brother Rice,	1969
 Paul Seymour, Former NFL Player, Royal Oak Shrine,	1968
 Richard Tarnas, Author, University of Detroit Jesuit,	1968
 Lawrence Joseph, Poet, University of Detroit Jesuit,	1966
 J. Richard Fredericks, Former U.S. Ambassador to Switzerland and Liechtenstein,	 Bloomfield Hills Brother Rice,	1964
 Gerald McGowan, Former U.S. Ambassador to Portugal,	Bloomfield Hills Brother Rice,	1964
 Bob King, United Auto Workers President, 	University of Detroit Jesuit,	1964
 Jim Seymour, Former NFL Player, Royal Oak Shrine,	1964
 James Tocco, internationally-known concert pianist, Austin Catholic Preparatory School, 1961.
 William "Bill" Chmielewski, Former ABA Player, Detroit Holy Redeemer,	1960
 William B. Fitzgerald, Jr., Majority Leader of the Senate, Michigan Legislature.  Austin Catholic Preparatory School, 1960
 Michael Moriarty, Actor,	University of Detroit Jesuit,	1959
 Michael Cavanagh, Michigan Supreme Court Justice,	University of Detroit Jesuit,	1958
 Dave DeBusschere, player for the Chicago White Sox, Detroit Pistons, and New York Knicks, Austin Catholic Preparatory School, 1958
 L. Brooks Patterson, Oakland County, Michigan Executive,	University of Detroit Jesuit,	1957
 Bruce Maher, Former NFL Player, University of Detroit Jesuit,	1955
 Greg Marx, Former NFL Player, Detroit Catholic Central, 1968
 J.P. McCarthy, WJR Radio Personality,	Warren De La Salle, 	1950
 Adam Maida, Former Cardinal Archbishop Emeritus of Detroit,	Orchard Lake St. Mary's,	1948
 Thomas E. Brennan, Former Chief Justice of the Michigan Supreme Court 	Detroit Catholic Central,	1947
 Manuel Moroun, Transportation Magnate,	University of Detroit Jesuit,	1945
 Elmore Leonard, Former novelist and screenwriter,	University of Detroit Jesuit,	1943
 John McCabe,  Author,	University of Detroit Jesuit,	1938
 Vince Banonis, Former NFL Player, Detroit Catholic Central,	1938
 Andy Farkas, Former NFL Player,	University of Detroit Jesuit,	1934
 George D. O'Brien,  Former U.S. Congressman,	University of Detroit Jesuit,	1917
 Louis C. Rabaut,  Former U.S. Congressman,	University of Detroit Jesuit,	1905

Girls' Basketball Championships

 Girls' basketball championship facts:
Since CHSL girls basketball championship games began being played in 1974, and through 2016, the Bloomfield Hills Marian Mustangs have won fifteen CHSL championships, the most of any school in league history. 
The Waterford Our Lady of the Lakes Lakers are second in league history with seven CHSL championships.
The Livonia Ladywood Blazers, the Farmington Hills Mercy Marlins and the Detroit St. Martin de Porres Eagles are all tied for third with six championships each.

Softball Championships

Softball championship facts:
Since CHSL softball championship games began being played in 1975, and through 2015, the Waterford Our Lady of the Lakes Lakers have won the most softball championships of any school in league history with fourteen. 
 The Allen Park Cabrini Monarchs have the second most softball championships with eleven, while the Warren Regina Saddlelites follow closely behind with ten championships.

Football Championships

In 1926, Detroit Holy Redeemer and Detroit St. Leo faced each other in the first football game to determine the champion of the Detroit Parochial League (later the CHSL). Holy Redeemer won that game 14-9.

The game has been played every year since 1926 under various names, with Detroit Catholic Central winning twenty-eight football league championship games, the most of any school in league history.

Starting in 1948, the league championship game was called "The Soup Bowl", as the Capuchin Soup kitchen became the benefactor of some of the proceeds from the game.
The Soup Bowl game was always played at University of Detroit Stadium. 
After the affiliation with the Capuchins ended in 1967 the game was called the "Charity Bowl" and since 1971 the "Prep Bowl".

The Prep Bowl was played at the Pontiac Silverdome and, since 2002, at Ford Field.  The Prep Bowl today also involves the Detroit Catholic Youth Organization (CYO) for Catholic elementary schools as well as games within the high school divisions of the CHSL.

Prep Bowl facts:

Through 2015, the winningest high schools in Prep Bowl history, regardless of divisions, are:
Bloomfield Hills Brother Rice (twenty-three A-B Division, Central-AA Division and Wildcard wins)
Detroit Catholic Central (twenty A-B Division, Central-AA Division and Wildcard wins)
Waterford Our Lady of the Lakes (fourteen C-D Division and Wildcard wins)

For all Prep Bowl high school football game results, click here

Soup Bowl Fact:

 St. Mary of Redford won the most Soup Bowl games (7) followed by Grosse Pointe St. Ambrose (5).

Parochial League Football Championship Facts:
 From 1926 to 1947, Detroit Catholic Central won the most league football championships (6) followed by Detroit Holy Redeemer (4) and Detroit St. Theresa of Avila (4).

Operation Friendship

In 1947, the Detroit City League boys basketball champion and the Detroit Parochial League boys basketball champion met at Olympia Stadium in Detroit to play for the first time to determine who would wear the crown as the Detroit City Basketball Champions. The game between Detroit Miller High School and Detroit St. Joseph High School drew so much interest it sold out Olympia Stadium, with a capacity of 11,563 and in so doing established a state record for attendance at a high school basketball game. 
This was the first of what would, in later years, become known as the Operation Friendship Championship pitting the best of the Detroit Public School League against the Catholic High School League. 
At the end of the evening, the Detroit Miller Trojans defeated the Detroit St. Joseph Blue Jays 47-34 to claim the first ever Detroit City Basketball High School Championship.
Since that game, the Detroit Public School League champions and the Detroit Catholic High School League champions have met nearly every year to determine the Detroit City Champions. In later years, the game would become known as the Operation Friendship Championship.  The game has been played at University of Detroit's Calihan Hall (formerly Memorial Hall) virtually every year, although Cobo Arena in Detroit has also hosted the basketball classic.

Operation Friendship facts:
The Public School League has won 41 of the 56 Operation Friendship Championship Games played through 2016.
Since 2005, the CHSL has won six Operation Friendship championships, while the PSL has won five.
Detroit Southwestern has won the most Operation Friendship championship games with nine, followed by Detroit Northwestern with five and Detroit Eastern/Detroit King with five. Orchard Lake St. Mary's Prep has won three Operation Friendship championship games, the most among CHSL schools.

Goodfellow Game

The Goodfellow Game was an annual high school football game for the unofficial city of Detroit high school football championship.  The game was played between the champions of the Detroit City League (later the Detroit Public School League) and the Detroit Parochial League (later the Catholic High School League).  The Goodfellow Game was played every year from 1938 through 1967.  The Goodfellow Game was always played at Briggs/Tiger Stadium.

The Goodfellow Game was played in a time before Michigan had a high school state championship playoff.  As a result, the Goodfellow Game was considered one of the state's most prestigious high school football games of its time.

Goodfellow Game facts:

 The Detroit Parochial League won sixteen Goodfellow Games, the Detroit City League won eleven and there were three ties in the 30 Goodfellow Games played.
The Detroit Denby Tars played in the most Goodfellow Games of any school with nine.  The Detroit St. Mary of Redford Rustics played in seven Goodfellow Games, the most among Detroit Parochial League schools.
The Grosse Pointe St. Ambrose Cavaliers and the Detroit Catholic Central Shamrocks won the most Goodfellow Games with five each.  The Detroit Denby Tars won four Goodfellow Games, the most among Detroit City League schools. 
The Grosse Pointe St. Ambrose Cavaliers had the most Goodfellow Game shutouts with three, while the Detroit Denby Tars had the most tied Goodfellow Games with two.
The University of Detroit High Cubs played in three Goodfellows Games, all representing the Detroit City League, before joining the Detroit Parochial League in 1958.
The Goodfellow Game regularly drew crowds of 40,000 spectators at its peak in the late 1950s and early 1960s.

References

External links
 Catholic High School League
 Aodonline.org

Michigan high school sports conferences
High school sports conferences and leagues in the United States
Catholic sports organizations
Roman Catholic Archdiocese of Detroit